Fyodorovka is a rural locality (a selo) in Ufa, Bashkortostan, Russia. The population was 545 as of 2010. There are 10 streets.

Geography 
Fyodorovka is located 18 km southeast of Ufa. Samokhvalovka is the nearest rural locality.

References 

Rural localities in Ufa urban okrug